Entre el Amor y el Odio is a Mexican telenovela based on radionovela Cadena de odio. This is a list of characters in this telenovela, with names of actors and actresses.

Main characters

Protagonists 
Ana Cristina Robles (Susana González)
Ana Cristina Robles is a beautiful young girl who lives in Guanajuato, Guanajuato, Mexico. She lives in hut with her "grandfather" and "brother". Her biological mother Leonela is dead, and Ana Cristina believes that her father is dead, too, but he is alive. She has a beautiful horse called Parnaso, named after Greek mountain.

She was a good friend with old Don Fernando, member of the noble Villarreal family. Marcial Andrade accused her that she was a lover of Fernando.

One day, she met Octavio, nephew of Fernando, and they fell in love, but there were many things that caused quarrels between them.

Octavio Villarreal (César Évora)
Octavio is a member of Villarreal family, a lonely man who is angry at his uncle Fernando. In the past, Fernando was against the marriage between Octavio and woman called Frida. However, when Octavio heard that his uncle is at his deathbed, he went to Guanajuato to see him for the last time, and on his way, he saw Ana Cristina on her horse.

Ana Cristina and Octavio fell in love, but Frida returns to Octavio in order to seduce him. Still, Octavio married Ana Cristina because this was the last will of his uncle, but also because he started to feel strong love for Ana.

His child by Ana Cristina is called Fernandito ("little Fernando").

Antagonists 

Frida de Villarreal (Sabine Moussier)
Frida is a young woman of great beauty and intelligence. She created persona of sweet and kind lady, but she is in reality a vamp and femme fatale.

Her aunt Cayetana raised her. Frida tried to marry Octavio, but Don Fernando gave plenty of money to her and her aunt, and Frida and Cayetana went to live a life full of luxury and perversions.

When Frida found out that Fernando is dead, she was very happy and went immediately to Guanajuato, where she found Octavio and Ana Cristina. Although Octavio married Ana, Frida still tried to sleep with him in order to keep him with her.

Eventually Frida fell in love with Octavio and went insane. She was committed to a mental hospital.

Marcial Andrade (Alberto Estrella)
Marcial, named after the Roman war god Mars, is the secret lover of Frida and fake best friend of Octavio. Together they run the Villareal company, but Marcial wants to have all the factory for himself. He is a cruel and ambitious man, but nonetheless intelligent and calculated, with an obsession for the French emperor Napoleon to such extent, that he plays strategy games on a table and having a real life sized Napoleon statue at home.

Octavioʻs aunt thinks that Marcial is a good person and keeps him with her in Villarreal villa, but Marcial tries to kill her. In fact, Marcial proves to be a serial killer, assassinating everyone who is in his path to obtain what he wants. He is responsible for the most deaths in the series.

Marcial slept with Frida many times and played erotic games with her, but he is in love with a beautiful woman, María Magdalena, who lost her husband. Marcial tries to marry her, but Frida bares him a son.

After getting leprosy, Frida invites Marcial over in a hotel room and shows him to an oil bath. Eventually, she shows her scars to Marcial and begs him to kiss her. Her appearance disgusts Marcial and in an act of revenge, Frida throws a torch in the oil bath, causing it to burst into flames. Marcial screams for help but is engulfed in the fire. Against all odds, he survives the ordeal, but ironically is heavily disfigured, even worse than Frida, who had previously repulsed him. He tries to kidnap Fernandito but is caught by Octavio. After climbing a ladder to the feet of a statue, he holds Octavio at knife point until Frida shows up. Marcial tries to convince her to kill everyone present, but after she hesitates, he calls her "mediocre" and she shoots him twice. He falls, but lives for a few more minutes. Struggling for his life he asks the people present to help him, but they all refuse, having suffered deeply because of his actions. He is given the chance to make amends, but he shows no regret over his actions and admits in a demonic voice that everything he did was for his "friend that he did not want to betray", heavily implying the Devil. He vows to return, since evil never ends and finally passes away.

Other characters

Villarreal family 
Except Octavio, other members of Villarreal family are:
Don Fernando Villarreal (Joaquín Cordero)
Fernando Villarreal was an old, humble and rich man, who was beloved by all Guanajuato and his workmen. He offered money to Frida and thus prevented the marriage between her and Octavio. He was a good friend and foster father of Ana Cristina.
Doña'' Josefa Villarreal (Marga López)Doña'' Josefa is a kind old woman, aunt of Octavio and sister of the late Fernando. Her other brother was Nicolás, father of Octavio. She is a foster mother of Ana Cristina, beloved by servants, Octavio and workers in her factory. 

Marcial tried to kill her by tarantulas.

Both Frida and Ana Cristina became wives of Octavio and members of Villarreal family.

Moreno family 
Rodolfo Moreno (José Ángel García)
Rodolfo was a head of the family, good man who worked for the happiness of his wife María Magdalena and his sons. He slept with Rebeca, his cousin-in-law, and fathered Gabriel with her and José Alfredo with María. Marcial killed him in hospital because he fell in love with María Magdalena.
María Magdalena (María Sorté)
María Magdalena is the wife of Rodolfo, biological mother of José Alfredo and foster mother and "aunt" of Gabriel. She is also a cousin of Rebeca and good friend with Ana Cristina. She married Marcial who was very violent to her.
Gabriel Moreno (Luis Roberto Guzmán)
Gabriel is a son of Rebeca and Rodolfo and half-brother (also step-brother) of José Alfredo. He believed that his mother is María Magdalena and slept with Cayetana. He raped young girl named Fuensenta and admired Marcial.
José Alfredo (Fabián Robles)
José Alfredo is a son of Rodolfo with María Magdalena, who loved Ana Cristina. Some time it was believed that his mother is Rosalía.

He is very noble and marries Fuensanta.

Fridaʻs family 
Cayetana (Maritza Olivares)
Cayetana was an aunt of Frida as a sister of Rosalía. She was also Frida's foster mother. She raised young Frida and wanted fortune of Villarreal family. She was at first friends with Marcial and slept with Gabriel. Later she was killed by a truck on the road.
Rosalía (Silvia Manríquez)
Rosalía is a mother of Frida who left her to Cayetana when Frida was born. However, Rosalía is a good woman who searched for her child. She found Frida and tried to care for her, but Frida was always rough to her.

Minor characters 
Carmen Salinas – Chelo, a good old woman
Armando Palomo – Libertad, nurse of Frida
Luz Elena González – Fuensanta, young woman who married José Alfredo 
Radamés de Jesús – Marcelino, stepbrother of Ana Cristina
Carlos Torres – Moises, love of Josefa and her servant
Ninón Sevilla – Macarena
Juan Carlos Serrán – Vicente
Mauricio Aspe – Tobias, evil friend of Marcial
Rubén Morales – Father Jesús Alarcón
Marlene Favela – Cecilia, killed by Marcial
Marcial Casale – Trinidad
Aurora Alonso – Prudencia
Carlos Amador – Chino
Patricia Romera – Lucha
Violeta Isfel – Paz, servant of Josefa
Marcelo Buquet – Facundo
José Luis Reséndez – Nazario, brother of Cecilia
Benjamín Rivero – Ratón, friend of Marcial
Alberto Loztin – Rubén Alarcón
Miguel Córcega –  Manuel Robles, foster father of Ana Cristina 
Jaime Lozano Aguilar – Dr. Ramos
Freddy Ortega – Caco
Germán Ortega – Queco
Oscar Traven – Nicolás Villarreal, father of Octavio and brother of Josefa
Jacqueline Bracamontes – Leonela, mother of Ana Cristina
Enrique Lizalde ‒ Rogelio Valencia, father of Ana Cristina and husband of Leonela
Felicia Mercado – Lucila Montes, lover of Rogelio
Víctor Noriega – Paulo Sacristán
Arturo Peniche – Fabio Sacristán, Paulo's brother

Notes 

Entre el Amor y el Odio
Entre el Amor y el Odio